Walid El Karti is a Moroccan professional footballer, who plays as an attacking midfielder for Pyramids FC.

Honours

Club

Wydad AC
Botola: 2014–15, 2016–17, 2018–19, 2020–21
CAF Champions League: 2017
CAF Super Cup: 2018

International
Morocco U20
Mediterranean Games: Gold medal 2013
Islamic Solidarity Games: Gold medal 2013
Jeux de la Francophonie: Silver medal 2013

Morocco A'
African Nations Championship: 2018, 2020

International career
In January 2014, coach Hassan Benabicha, invited him to be a part of the Moroccan squad for the 2014 African Nations Championship. He helped the team to top group B after drawing with Burkina Faso and Zimbabwe and defeating Uganda. The team was eliminated from the competition at the quarter final stage after losing to Nigeria.

International goals
Scores and results list Morocco's goal tally first.

References

External links
 

Living people
Moroccan footballers
Morocco international footballers
Association football midfielders
2014 African Nations Championship players
1994 births
Wydad AC players
Olympique Club de Khouribga players
Mediterranean Games gold medalists for Morocco
Mediterranean Games medalists in football
Competitors at the 2013 Mediterranean Games
Morocco A' international footballers
Moroccan expatriate sportspeople in Egypt
Moroccan expatriate footballers
Expatriate footballers in Egypt
Pyramids FC players
2018 African Nations Championship players
2020 African Nations Championship players